The Guayaquil flooded grasslands (NT0905) is an ecoregion near the Pacific coast of the Ecuador. The ecoregion is critically endangered due to conversion into agricultural land.

Location
The Guayaquil flooded grasslands ecoregion is in the southwest of Ecuador in the delta of the Guayas River, extending south to the mangroves of the Gulf of Guayaquil.
The Guayaquil flooded grasslands adjoin the Western Ecuador moist forests ecoregion to the west and north, and a section of the Ecuadorian dry forests ecoregion to the east. 
To the southeast they merge into the South American Pacific mangroves ecoregion.
The extreme south adjoins the Tumbes–Piura dry forests.

Physical

The Köppen climate classification is "Aw": equatorial, dry winter.
In a sample location at coordinates  temperatures are fairly constant throughout the year, slightly cooler in July and slightly warmer in April.

Ecology

The Guayaquil flooded grasslands are in the neotropical realm, in the flooded grasslands and savannas biome.

The grasslands are seasonally flooded, and also hold riparian flora.
Endangered birds include yellow-bellied seedeater (Sporophila nigricollis) and Peruvian tern (Sternula lorata).
Endangered reptiles include green sea turtle (Chelonia mydas) and hawksbill sea turtle (Eretmochelys imbricata).

Status

The World Wildlife Fund gives the ecoregion a status of "Critical/Endangered".
Threats come from the steady growth of the human population and large-scale irrigation programs for agriculture.
67.1% of the area had been transformed.

Notes

Sources

Neotropical ecoregions
Ecoregions of Ecuador